Colin Brown (born 1962) is a British film journalist, based in New York City, who has been editor and editor-in-chief of the trade magazine Screen International.

Brown was educated at St John's College, Cambridge and went into journalism on graduation, spending the whole of his career to date working for Screen.

Brown is also a keen supporter of Leeds United A. F. C.

References

1962 births
Living people
English male journalists
Alumni of St John's College, Cambridge